Komsomolsk-on-Amur is a city in Khabarovsk Krai, Russia, located on the west bank of the Amur River in the Russian Far East. Population:

Geography
The city and its suburbs stretch for over  along the left bank of the Amur River. Lake Khummi is located southeast of the city.

History

The future site of Komsomolsk-on-Amur was conquered by the Mongols in the 13th century, becoming part of the Mongol Empire under the Mongol Yuan Dynasty. It was later held by the Manchus until the area was ceded to the Russian Empire in the treaty of Aigun in 1858. The village of Permskoye was established on the later site of Komsomolsk in 1860 by migrant peasants from what is now the Perm Krai.

The government of the Russian SFSR announced in 1931 plans to construct a shipyard on the Amur at the present site of Komsomolsk, with construction beginning in 1932. The town was largely built using volunteer labor from the Communist youth organization Komsomol, thus receiving the name Komsomolsk. However, the construction of the town was aided with the use of penal labour from the prison camps situated in the area.  The suffix on Amur was added to differentiate from other towns with the same name. It was granted town status in 1933.

By the end of the 1940s, the shipyards along with facilities for other heavy industry had been completed. The city developed into a regional center for industries such as aircraft manufacturing, metallurgy, machinery, oil refining, and shipbuilding. At present, Komsomolsk-on-Amur is the main center for the manufacture of Sukhoi military aircraft and the Sukhoi Superjet airliner. The MiG-15bis  and the Lisunov Li-2 were both manufactured in Komsomolsk-on-Amur.

Administrative and municipal status
Within the framework of administrative divisions, Komsomolsk-on-Amur serves as the administrative center of Komsomolsky District, even though it is not a part of it. As an administrative division, it is incorporated separately as the city of krai significance of Komsomolsk-na-Amure—an administrative unit with the status equal to that of the districts. As a municipal division, the city of krai significance of Komsomolsk-na-Amure is incorporated as Komsomolsk-na-Amure Urban Okrug. The city is administratively divided into 2 okrugs (previously raion), coinciding with the historical parts: Leninsky (Dzemgi) and Central.

In the Soviet period, the administrative-territorial division of the city was different from the present. In accordance with the Decree of the Presidium of the Supreme Soviet of the RSFSR of 19 October 1943 were formed Lenin, Stalin and Central areas. Stalinsky district included the territory of Railway Amurstali and residential community.

Presidium of the Supreme Soviet of the RSFSR "On the Abolition of the city of Komsomolsk-on-Amur, Khabarovsk Krai" on August 7, 1957 in the district division was abolished, but the decree of March 31, 1972 the Presidium of the Supreme Soviet of the newly divided the city into two districts - Central and Leninsky.

Layout

Komsomolsk-on-Amur consists of two historical parts: the center, or "city", where the main enterprise - Shipyard, and the  Dzemgi - an area that has formed during the construction of an aircraft factory (future KnAAPO). In fact, each of the parts is a separate town, itself a single center in the city.

Areas of the city are very different architectural appearance: Center Stalinist buildings dominated the 40-50s (exception - the residential area near the railway station), Dzemgi is built up mainly typical panel apartment blocks. The "sleeping" area Dzemgi is not, as the majority of their residents work in enterprises located here.

Climate
Komsomolsk-on-Amur has a humid continental climate (Köppen Dfb).

Economy and infrastructure
Komsomolsk-on-Amur is an important industrial center of Khabarovsk Krai and of the Russian Far East. It has a diversified economy where machine building, metallurgy and timber enterprises dominate.

The city's most notable company is Komsomolsk-on-Amur Aircraft Production Association, Russia's largest aircraft-manufacturing enterprise. It is among Khabarovsk Krai's most successful enterprises, and for years has been the largest taxpayer of the territory. It has manufactured hundreds of civil aircraft and thousands of various-role military aircraft from the first recon aircraft to modern Su- series fighters and light amphibian aeroplanes. The company is hugely important to the city's economy, contributing 45% of all payments into the local budget.

Also based in the city is Amur Shipbuilding Plant, an important producer of ships and submarines.

The easternmost GLONASS telemetry and tracking station is located in Komsomolsk-on-Amur.

Two air bases are located near the city, Khurba to the south and Dzemgi to the north.

Komsomolsk-on-Amur railway station is an important rail junction of Baikal-Amur Mainline and Komsomolsk-Dezhnyovka railway line.

The city is served by the Komsomolsk-on-Amur Airport

Public transport includes 5 tram routes, bus and fixed-taxi (marshrutka). However, since January 10, 2018 the tram has not been operated, due to 'poor road condition' on Mira Prospect. It has yet to reopen and it was speculated that the suspension of tram traffic might become permanent.

The first sortie of the Sukhoi Su-57 prototype occurred at the Gagarin Factory.

Twin towns – sister cities

Komsomolsk-on-Amur is twinned with:
 Jiamusi, China (1994)
 Kamo, Japan (1991)
 Weinan, China (2016)

Notable residents

Alex Chubrevich, Israeli-Russian professional basketball player for Maccabi Haifa of the Israeli Super League.
Yuliya Chepalova, cross-country skier.
Anatoly Dyatlov, deputy chief-engineer of the Chernobyl Nuclear Power Plant
Yury Gazinsky, footballer, scorer of the first goal at the 2018 FIFA World Cup, was born in the city
Alexandra Ivanovskaya, "Miss Russia 2005"
Valentina Khetagurova (1914–1992), founder of the Khetagurovite Campaign
Pasha Kovalev, professional dancer
Sergei Plotnikov, ice hockey player with Pittsburgh Penguins, NHL
Ivan Shtyl, sprint canoer

See also
Komsomolsk-on-Amur road-rail bridge

References

Notes

Sources

External links

Sports in Komsomolsk-on-Amur
FC Smena (Komsomolsk-on-Amur) 

Cities and towns in Khabarovsk Krai
Cities and towns built in the Soviet Union
1860 establishments in the Russian Empire